Armour Theatre Building is a historic theatre building located at North Kansas City, Missouri.  It was designed by the architectural firm Keene & Simpson and built in 1928. It is a two-story, polychromatic brick building with Spanish Eclectic style design elements.  It features a Mission tile roof, arched fenestration and decorative tiles, and glazed terra cotta detailing.  The building houses the theater, community rooms, and offices.

It was listed on the National Register of Historic Places in 2008.

References

External links
Theater website
Cinema Treasures

Theatres on the National Register of Historic Places in Missouri
Mission Revival architecture in Missouri
Theatres completed in 1928
Buildings and structures in Clay County, Missouri
National Register of Historic Places in Kansas City, Missouri